Beorhtweald Ealdorman of Kent was an English ruler of the 9th century AD. His father was Burgred of Mercia, his mother: Æthelswith, and his brother: Beorhtnoð æthling of Kent.

Year of birth missing
Year of death missing
9th-century rulers in Europe
9th-century English people
Anglo-Saxon ealdormen